The Ligne de Cerdagne, usually referred to as Le Petit Train Jaune, is a  gauge railway that runs from Villefranche-de-Conflent to Latour-de-Carol-Enveitg in the French Pyrenees.

History of the Line 
The section of line between Villefranche-de-Conflent and Bourg-Madame was declared a public utility by law on 4 March 1903.  This same law approved the granting of a concession for the line, signed on 5 December 1902, between the Minister of Public Works and the Compagnie des Chemins de Fer du Midi et du Canal Latéral à la Garonne. The law also superseded an earlier proposed standard gauge railway which had been authorised between Villefranche-de-Conflent and Olette, but never built.

A second law was approved on 23 March 1914 to extend the railway from Bourg-Madame to the 'French frontier station' of the transpyrenean line from Ax les Thermes to Ripoll, although the present station name at the terminus of Latour de Carol Enveitg was not mentioned.  The declaration of public utility for this section of the line was confirmed on 4 September 1922.

Construction started in 1903 and the section to Mont-Louis was completed in 1910, followed by the extension to Latour-de-Carol in 1927.

Description of the Line 
The line serves 22 stations, fourteen of which are "request stops" (i.e., the train only stops when specifically requested by passengers). There are 19 tunnels, the longest of which is the Tunnel du Pla de Llaurar with a length of 380 meters, located at kilometre point 59.639.

Amongst the various structures along the line, two viaducts over the River Têt are classified as Historic Monuments because of their architectural and technical importance: 

 At kilometer point 18.002 the Pont Séjourné, in the town of Fontpédrouse, is a masonry viaduct 236.70 meters long;
 At kilometre point 24.422, the Pont Cassagne (also known as Pont Gisclard) is 253 meters long and unusually for a railway bridge, is a suspension bridge,  the only one in France located on an operating railway.

The line is single-track with passing loops at, for example, Mont-Louis and Fontpédrouse-Saint-Thomas-les-Bains.

The trains are powered by electricity at 850 volts DC, supplied by third rail. The power is supplied by hydro-electric generators on the River Têt. Two types of train are used; ones using modern, entirely closed two-car multiple units and others using old style trailer carriages and powered carriages - most are enclosed but when the weather allows, open carriages are also used. The open carriages allow dramatic views as the train traverses the twisting route and are popular with tourists. Line maintenance vehicles are stored at Villefranche-de-Conflent.

It is named after its yellow and red colours, derived from the Catalan flag. The line was constructed to provide an all-weather route from the high Cerdagne valley to the coast, but the adjacent N116 road has been progressively improved, there has been population loss in the Cerdagne and the rail link is now chiefly a tourist attraction whose long-term future is in doubt.

List of stations

Electrical discharges
In 1911, railway workers reported a fireball on the third rail between kilometres 28 and 40. A similar phenomenon occurred again when a train was hit by one of these fireballs during a thunderstorm. Lightning rods were installed where these events had occurred and the phenomenon has not been reported since installation.

See also
List of highest railways in Europe

References

External links

 , Train Jaune (Yellow Train) official SNCF page
 about-france.com, The Little Yellow Train of the Pyrenees, route, sightseeing, practical information and photos
 countrycousins.co.uk, History of the Yellow Train

Electric railways in France
Metre gauge railways in France
Mountain railways
Transport in Occitania (administrative region)
Tourist attractions in Pyrénées-Orientales
Railway lines opened in 1910